Charles Fillery Comber (26 December 1891 – 4 February 1966) was an Australian rules footballer who played with Essendon in the Victorian Football League (VFL).

Notes

External links 
		

1891 births
1966 deaths
Australian rules footballers from Victoria (Australia)
Essendon Football Club players
People from Burwood, Victoria